The Philippine House Committee on Labor and Employment, or House Labor and Employment Committee is a standing committee of the Philippine House of Representatives.

Jurisdiction 
As prescribed by House Rules, the committee's jurisdiction includes the following:
 Advancement and protection of the rights and welfare of worker
 Employment and manpower development inclusive of the promotion of industrial peace and employer-employee cooperation
 Labor education
 Labor standards and statistics
 Organization and development of the labor market including the recruitment, training and placement of manpower

Members, 18th Congress

Historical members

18th Congress

Vice Chairperson 
 Rodolfo Albano (LPGMA)

Member for the Majority 
 Francisco Datol Jr. (SENIOR CITIZENS)

See also
 House of Representatives of the Philippines
 List of Philippine House of Representatives committees
 Labor Code of the Philippines
 Department of Labor and Employment

Notes

References

External links 
House of Representatives of the Philippines

Labor and Employment
Labor in the Philippines
Employment in the Philippines